Trout Lake is located west of Bolton, New York. Fish species present in the lake are brook trout, rainbow trout, splake, lake trout, smallmouth bass, largemouth bass, pickerel, yellow perch, smelt, rock bass, rainbow smelt, brown trout and brown bullhead. There is a carry down trail on the northeast shore via trail off Lamb Hill Road. There is a 50 horsepower motor limit on this lake. It is called Trout Lake due to the high numbers of lake trout and rainbow trout that are found in the lake.

References

Lakes of New York (state)
Lakes of Warren County, New York